Supreme Industries Limited is an Indian plastics company, based in Mumbai. It handles volumes of over 320,000 tonnes of polymers annually. The company manufactures industrial and engineering molded furniture products, storage and material handling crates, multi-layer sheets, multi-layer films, packaging films, expanded polyethylene foam, PVC pipes and fittings, molded furniture, sataranj mats, disposable EPS containers.

References

External links
 Official Website

Manufacturing companies established in 1942
Manufacturing companies based in Mumbai
Conglomerate companies of India
Plastics companies of India
1942 establishments in India
Companies listed on the National Stock Exchange of India
Companies listed on the Bombay Stock Exchange